Mortegliano is a comune (municipality) in   the Italian region Friuli-Venezia Giulia, located about 60 km northwest of Trieste and about 14 km southwest of Udine.

Mortegliano borders the following municipalities: Bicinicco, Castions di Strada, Lestizza, Pavia di Udine, Pozzuolo del Friuli, Talmassons.

Twin towns
Mortegliano is twinned with:

  Arborea, Italy

References

External links
 Official website
Aerial photo of Mortegliano